Nathaniel Webb may refer to:

 Nathaniel Jarrett Webb (1891–1943), American politician in the Virginia House of Delegates
 Nathaniel Webb (MP) (1725–1786), West Indies plantation owner and British politician